Jules Degeetere (7 April 1876 – 10 February 1957) was a Belgian racing cyclist. He won the Belgian national road race title in 1899.

References

External links

1876 births
1957 deaths
Belgian male cyclists
Cyclists from West Flanders
People from Roeselare